Ahmed Ibrahim Ali  is a UAE football midfielder who played for United Arab Emirates in the 1996 Asian Cup. He also played for Al-Sharjah.

External links

1970 births
Living people
Emirati footballers
Sharjah FC players
United Arab Emirates international footballers
1996 AFC Asian Cup players
1997 FIFA Confederations Cup players
UAE Pro League players
Association football midfielders
Footballers at the 1994 Asian Games
Asian Games competitors for the United Arab Emirates